Wecker is a surname. Notable people with the surname include:

Andreas Wecker (born 1970), German Olympic gymnast
David Wecker (born ?), American radio host and newspaper columnist
Georg Caspar Wecker (bapt. 1632–1695), German Baroque organist and composer
Helene Wecker (born 1975), an American writer, Mythopoeic Award-winner for historical fantasy
Johannes Jacob Wecker (1528–1586), Swiss physician
Kendra Wecker (born 1982), American basketball player
Konstantin Wecker (born 1947), German singer and songwriter
Louis de Wecker (1832–1906), French ophthalmologist
William Booth Wecker (1892–1969), American entertainer, showman, and army veteran